Ben Sturnham (born ) is a former English rugby union player.  He played for Saracens (1993-98 as U19, on contract 1997-98), Bath (1998-2000) and Bristol Shoguns (2000-2002). In 2002 his playing career was ended by a knee injury.  He won three England caps on the 1998 Tour of Hell.

Educated at Verulam School

References 
 http://www.espnscrum.com/england/rugby/player/12881.html

1974 births
Living people
English rugby union players
England international rugby union players